Jonathan Taylor Updegraff (May 13, 1822 – November 30, 1882) was an American physician and politician who served as a U.S. Representative from Ohio from 1879 to 1882.

Biography
Born near Mount Pleasant, Ohio, a descendant of the Dutch Op den Graeff family, Jonathan was the son of David Updegraff, a Quaker minister, and grandson of Nathan Updegraff, a delegate to Ohio's first constitutional convention. Jonathan attended private schools and Franklin College. He studied medicine. He was graduated from the University of Pennsylvania at Philadelphia in 1845 and later from medical schools in Edinburgh and Paris.

Although he practiced his profession, he devoted a large share of his time to agricultural pursuits. He served as a surgeon in the Union Army during the Civil War. He served in the State senate in 1872 and 1873, and as a Presidential elector for Grant/Wilson in 1872. He served as delegate to the Republican State convention in 1873 and to the 1876 Republican National Convention.

Updegraff was elected as a Republican to the Forty-sixth and Forty-seventh Congresses and served from March 4, 1879, until his death in Mount Pleasant, Ohio, November 30, 1882. More than 2000 people viewed his corpse at the Friends Meetinghouse.
He served as chairman of the Committee on Education and Labor (Forty-seventh Congress).
Updegraff had been reelected to the Forty-eighth Congress prior to his death, and his position was filled by Joseph D. Taylor.

He was initially interred in Updegraff Cemetery, near Mount Pleasant, Ohio but was later reinterred in Short Creek Cemetery, west of Mount Pleasant, in 1926.

The house built by Updegraff in 1856 remains in Mount Pleasant.

See also
List of United States Congress members who died in office (1790–1899)

References

 Retrieved on 2009-05-13

External links 

 Updegraff Family papers held by Haverford College Quaker & Special Collections

1822 births
1882 deaths
People from Mount Pleasant, Ohio
Republican Party Ohio state senators
Perelman School of Medicine at the University of Pennsylvania alumni
Franklin College (New Athens, Ohio)
1872 United States presidential electors
Union Army surgeons
Physicians from Ohio
American Quakers
19th-century American politicians
Republican Party members of the United States House of Representatives from Ohio